Bill Andrews may refer to:
 Bill Andrews (unionist) (1870–1950), South African trade union leader and politician
 Bill Andrews (cricketer) (1908–1989), English cricketer
 Bill Andrews (photographer) (1944–2017), American surfer, documentary photographer, and archivist
 Bill Andrews (drummer) (born 1966), American musician
 T. Bill Andrews (born 1958), American abstract painter and writer
 William C. Andrews (art director), a British production designed often known by this name

See also
Billy Andrews (born 1945), American football player
Billy Andrews (footballer) (born 1886), Irish-American footballer
William Andrews (disambiguation)